In functional analysis, a topological vector space (TVS) is said to be countably barrelled if every weakly bounded countable union of equicontinuous subsets of its continuous dual space is again equicontinuous. 
This property is a generalization of barrelled spaces.

Definition 

A Hausdorff locally convex TVS is countably barrelled if and only if each barrel in X that is equal to the countable intersection of closed convex balanced neighborhoods of 0 is itself a neighborhood of 0.

σ-barrelled space 

Sequentially barrelled space 

Properties 

Every countably barrelled space is a countably quasibarrelled space, a σ-barrelled space, a σ-quasi-barrelled space, and a sequentially barrelled space.
An H-space is a TVS whose strong dual space is countably barrelled. 

Every countably barrelled space is a σ-barrelled space and every σ-barrelled space is sequentially barrelled. 
Every σ-barrelled space is a σ-quasi-barrelled space.

A locally convex quasi-barrelled space that is also a 𝜎-barrelled space is a barrelled space.

Examples and sufficient conditions 

Every barrelled space is countably barrelled. 
However, there exist semi-reflexive countably barrelled spaces that are not barrelled. 
The strong dual of a distinguished space and of a metrizable locally convex space is countably barrelled.

Counter-examples 

There exist σ-barrelled spaces that are not countably barrelled. 
There exist normed DF-spaces that are not countably barrelled.
There exists a quasi-barrelled space that is not a 𝜎-barrelled space. 
There exist σ-barrelled spaces that are not Mackey spaces. 
There exist σ-barrelled spaces that are not countably quasi-barrelled spaces and thus not countably barrelled.
There exist sequentially barrelled spaces that are not σ-quasi-barrelled. 
There exist quasi-complete locally convex TVSs that are not sequentially barrelled.

See also 

 Barrelled space
 H-space
 Quasibarrelled space

References

   
  
  
  
 

Functional analysis